"Lowdown" is a song originally recorded in 1976 by Boz Scaggs from his album Silk Degrees. The song was co-written by Scaggs and keyboardist David Paich. Paich, along with fellow "Lowdown" session musicians bassist David Hungate and drummer Jeff Porcaro, would later go on to form the band Toto.

Release and reaction
Initially, Silk Degrees received a lukewarm commercial response and, similarly, the first single released from the album, "It's Over" barely cracked the top 40 on the Billboard Pop Singles chart, peaking at #38.  One day, however, a Cleveland R&B radio DJ began playing "Lowdown" straight off the album.  That was at a time when DJs had much more say in what was played on their programs. Public response was very positive and soon Scaggs' record label, Columbia, sent the song to other R&B-oriented radio stations for airplay. 

It broke big on Top 40 Pop stations as well, and when it was officially released as a single, it became Scaggs' first major hit, reaching #1 on the Cash Box Top 100 and number three on the Billboard Pop Singles chart. It was also successful on the R&B and Disco Singles charts, peaking at number five on both. The song was also a major hit in Canada, peaking at number two. It was a minor hit in the UK, topping out at #28. 

Scaggs is quoted as saying that the success of "Lowdown" was "an accident" and that, even though it was their favorite from Silk Degrees, he and the others involved in the making of the song thought there "wasn't a chance in hell" that it would be released as a single. The single was certified gold by the RIAA for sales of one million copies and would go on to win the Grammy Award for Best R&B Song at the 19th Annual Grammy Awards.

Renditions 
 In 1996 Scaggs recorded an unplugged jazz version for his Fade into Light album.
 In 2001 saxophonist Jimmy Sommers recorded a smooth jazz arrangement with rapper Coolio on background vocals. The song was released on his album 360 Urban Groove.
 In 2020, the English band Disclosure has sampled Lowdown in their track Expressing What Matters.

Usage in film
 "Lowdown" plays in a singles bar in the 1977 American crime drama film Looking for Mr. Goodbar.
 "Lowdown" is heard in the David Fincher 2007 American mystery thriller movie Zodiac, in the diner scene depicting real life character Robert "Bob" Graysmith telling Inspector Dave Toschi what he knew about the Zodiac Killer.

Chart performance

Weekly charts

Year-end charts

Personnel

 Boz Scaggs – lead vocals
 David Paich – Moog synthesizer, ARP synthesizer, Minimoog, Hammond organ
 Fred Tackett – guitar
 Louis Shelton – guitar
 David Hungate – bass
 Jeff Porcaro – drums
 Carolyn Willis – background vocals
 Marty McCall – background vocals
 Jim Gilstrap – background vocals
 Augie Johnson – background vocals
 Joe Wissert – producer

References

External links
 

1976 singles
1976 songs
Boz Scaggs songs
Columbia Records singles
Cashbox number-one singles
Disco songs
Songs written by Boz Scaggs
Songs written by David Paich
Song recordings produced by Joe Wissert